Ralph Graves (born Ralph Horsburgh; January 23, 1900 – February 18, 1977) was an American screenwriter, film director and actor who appeared in more than 90 films between 1918 and 1949.

Biography 
Born in Cleveland, Ohio, Graves had already been cast in 46 films, half of them produced by Mack Sennett, before he wrote, directed, and starred in Swell Hogan in 1926. That film was produced by Howard Hughes, whose father had once supported the young actor in the early stages of his career by placing him on the payroll of the Hughes Tool Company between screen assignments, even though Graves never actually worked there.

 
Graves and the younger Hughes met on the Wilshire Country Club golf course, and over lunch the actor pitched a film about a Bowery bum who adopts a baby. The plot intrigued Hughes, who had a strong interest in Hollywood, and he invested $40,000 in the project. During filming he sat on the sidelines in order to familiarize himself with the technical aspects of production. The budget eventually doubled, and after seeing the completed film numerous times, Hughes hired Dorothy Arzner to help him re-edit it, but there was little they could do to salvage it. 

When asked his opinion of it, Hughes' uncle, novelist and film director Rupert Hughes, said, "It's nothing. No plot. No build up. No character development. The acting stinks. Destroy the film. If anybody sees it, you and that homo Graves will be the laughing stock of Hollywood." Hughes took his uncle's advice and ordered the screening room projectionist to burn the sole copy. Graves later claimed he and Hughes had engaged in a sexual relationship while collaborating on Swell Hogan.

Despite this temporary setback, Graves directed four more films in 1927 and contributed the story or wrote the screenplay for 12 additional films, but most of his career was spent acting. While working for Sennett, Graves met director Frank Capra, who later cast him in several films, which include the 1929 release Flight, based on a story by Graves, as well as a series of adventure films with fellow actor Jack Holt.

Graves became engaged to actress Ann May after meeting her at the studio of D.W. Griffith.

Graves retired from films in 1949. He died in Santa Barbara, California, aged 77.

Selected filmography

References

External links 

 

1900 births
1977 deaths
Male actors from Cleveland
American male film actors
American male silent film actors
American male screenwriters
Writers from Cleveland
Film directors from California
Film directors from Ohio
Screenwriters from Ohio
Screenwriters from California
20th-century American male actors
20th-century American male writers
20th-century American screenwriters